University of Rome may refer to:

 Sapienza University of Rome, founded in 1303
 Università Cattolica del Sacro Cuore, Rome satellite campus opened 1961
 University of Rome Tor Vergata, founded in 1982
 Roma Tre University, founded in 1992
 Foro Italico University of Rome, founded in 1998

See also
 Rome University of Fine Arts